Udang balado or Sambal goreng udang is a hot and spicy shrimp dish commonly found in Indonesian cuisine. It is made of shrimp, either peeled or unpeeled, stir-fried in hot and spicy sambal paste in small amount of cooking oil.

Ingredients
The bumbu (spice mixture) used in sambal shrimp includes shallot, garlic, candlenut, ginger, shrimp paste, turmeric, galangal, red chili pepper, all mixed and ground with salt and water. Also add bruised lemongrass, daun salam (Indonesian bayleaf), citrus leaf, all stir fried in cooking oil (usually palm or coconut oil) until the spice mixture releases its aroma. Then cleaned shrimp, either ways can be prepared peeled or unpeeled, are stir fried together until it is cooked. Additional ingredient might be added, such as green beans and quail eggs, fried diced potato, tofu, or green stinky beans.

Variants
Shrimp cooked in sambal chili paste is quite common in various cooking traditions of Indonesia; from Minangkabau (Padang) to Malay, Sundanese, Javanese, Balinese and Manado. In Minangkabau tradition it is known as balado udang and considered as one variant of spicy balado dish.

See also

List of shrimp dishes
Cuisine of Indonesia
Sambal
Rica-rica
Dabu-dabu

References

External links
Sambal Goreng Udang recipe video by Tastemade
Sambal shrimp recipe 
Sambal Tumis Udang (Sauteed Chilli Shrimp) recipe

Shrimp dishes
Padang cuisine
Balinese cuisine
Indonesian cuisine